Hentz is a surname. Notable people with the surname include:

 Caroline Lee Hentz (1800–1856), American novelist and author
 Charlie Hentz (born 1948), American basketball player
 Eta Hentz (1895-1986), Hungarian-American fashion designer
 Morgan Hentz (born 1997), American volleyball player
 Nicholas Marcellus Hentz (1797–1856), French American educator and arachnologist

See also
 Wentz

Surnames from given names